Werner Andermatt (28 July 1916 – 29 May 2013) was a Swiss painter.

Andermatt was born in July 1916 in Zug. From 1935 to 1938, he studied at the Kunstgewerbeschule in Lucerne (Lucerne University of Applied Sciences and Arts), and then trained as a teacher of drawing and graphic arts. He studied in Paris at (Académie de la Grande Chaumière), and Zurich (Academy Wabel).
From 1938 to 1948, he worked as a graphic artist and book designer. In 1948, he started working as a teacher of figure drawing and graphic arts at the Kunstgewerbeschule Luzern, and from 1950 to 1981, he served as its director. He was also a member of the GSMBA (Society of Swiss Painters, Sculptors and Architects), of Central Switzerland.

Andermatt lived and worked in Lucerne. He was married for 40 years, and had four sons and one daughter. He died in May 2013 at the age of 96.

Awards
1986 Culture in central Switzerland
1996 Badge of the city of Lucerne

References

External links
"Werner Andermatt", Artnet
"Werner Andermatt", Kunstschaffende  	

1916 births
2013 deaths
20th-century Swiss male artists
20th-century Swiss painters
21st-century Swiss male artists
21st-century Swiss painters
Alumni of the Académie de la Grande Chaumière
Swiss male painters